Harold R. "Champ" Henson III (born June 1, 1953 ) is a former college and professional American football fullback.

Henson attended The Ohio State University where he led the nation in scoring as a sophomore in 1972.  In the second game of the 1973 season, however, Henson tore the cartilage his knee and was out for the season.  Linebacker Bruce Elia was converted to starting fullback.  In his senior season Henson was hampered by the lingering effects of his knee injury and challenged by sophomore Pete Johnson.

Henson was selected in the fourth round of the 1975 NFL Draft by the Minnesota Vikings, who then traded him to the Cincinnati Bengals.

Statistics

Henson's statistics are as follows:

Political career

In March 2012, Harold was selected as the Republican nominee for Pickaway County Commissioner by a 67-33 margin. He was unopposed in the November election, where he received over 16,000 votes. He was sworn in and will serve until January 2015. In 2016, Henson was once again nominated as the Republican nominee for Commissioner and defeated his two general election opponents by receiving more than 60 percent of the vote.

Election Results

See also
 List of NCAA major college football yearly scoring leaders

References

1953 births
Living people
American football running backs
Cincinnati Bengals players
Ohio State Buckeyes football players
County commissioners in Ohio
Players of American football from Columbus, Ohio
People from Ashville, Ohio